Lighthouse Theatre is the main theatre in Warrnambool in the State of Victoria, Australia.

References

Theatres in Victoria